was an 18th-century kabuki actor.

He was born to a family of samurai in Fushimi in Yamashiro province and was adopted by Jinzô, an usher working at the Minamigawa no Shibai (Minami-za) in Kyôto. Later on, he trained in the Kamigata theaters under Sanogawa Mangiku.
He settled in Edo in the 11th lunar month of 1744, where he stayed and won fame as a kabuki actor up to his death in the 11th lunar month of 1762.

References

Kabuki
18th-century Japanese male actors
1722 births
1762 deaths